Poa kerguelensis is a species of tussock grass native to various subantarctic islands.  The specific epithet refers to the type locality – the Kerguelen Islands.

Description
Poa kerguelensis is a perennial grass growing as hummocks up to 80 mm high and 150 mm in diameter.

Distribution and habitat
The grass is found on the Heard, McDonald and Kerguelen Islands of the southern Indian Ocean.  It grows on bare soil and in rocky areas where its hummocks trap wind-blown sand.  On Heard Island it hybridises with Poa cookii   It is a pioneer coloniser of recently deglaciated areas.

References

Notes

Sources
 
 

kerguelensis
Flora of the Kerguelen Islands
Flora of Heard Island and McDonald Islands